Makora is a genus of South Pacific intertidal spiders first described by Raymond Robert Forster & C. L. Wilton in 1973.

Species
 it contains five species, all found in New Zealand:
Makora calypso (Marples, 1959) – New Zealand
Makora detrita Forster & Wilton, 1973 – New Zealand
Makora diversa Forster & Wilton, 1973 – New Zealand
Makora figurata Forster & Wilton, 1973 – New Zealand
Makora mimica Forster & Wilton, 1973 – New Zealand

References

Araneomorphae genera
Desidae
Taxa named by Raymond Robert Forster